Lame-O Records is an independent record label based in Philadelphia, Pennsylvania. Founded by Eric Osman to release Modern Baseball's Sports, the label has been hailed as one of Philadelphia's best indie labels.

History
Lame-O Records was founded in 2012 by Eric Osman, manager of the band Modern Baseball, to release the band's debut LP Sports. Osman funded the 300-copy pressing with savings earned working at coffee shops. Though Sports earned the label no profit, it quickly sold out and has subsequently been repressed four times.

The label was not originally supposed to continue beyond Sports, but Osman decided to take advantage of the opportunities afforded by the success of the first album. Lame-O began signing Philadelphia-area acts including Ma Jolie, Steady Hands, the Hundred Acre Woods, the Superweaks, and Three Man Cannon. Osman enlisted fellow Drexel University student Emily Hakes during the planning stages of the Hundred Acre Woods' Cold in the Morning 7" single, shortly before the label expanded beyond Philly in 2014, signing the London-based group Johnny Foreigner.

The label earned acclaim in 2015 for their successful Strength in Weakness compilation. The six-way split (featuring Lame-O's Modern Baseball and The Superweaks as well as Spraynard, Marietta, Hurry, and Beach Slang) was sold to raise money for United Cerebral Palsy in honor of Modern Vinyl managing editor James Cassar. The 500-copy pressing sold out immediately. The EP also served as Hakes' senior project for her music industry degree, while the accompanying shows at First Unitarian and Saint Vitus was Osman's for his entertainment & artist management degree.

Lame-O has earned praise for their DIY ethic and commitment; Ma Jolie frontman Kirk Malosh commented, "It’s like they’re in the band... Any time anyone puts that much of an investment into your music, it’s unbelievable."

Artists

 An Horse
 Attia Taylor
 Big Nothing
 Cartalk
 Dazy
 Dominic Angelella
 Dust Star
 Gladie
 Golden Apples
 Great Cynics
 The Hundred Acre Woods
 Hurry
 Johnny Foreigner
 Lithuania
 Loose Tooth
 Lowercase Roses
 Ma Jolie
 The Max Levine Ensemble
 Mike Bell & The Movies
 Mo Troper
 Modern Baseball
 No Thank You
 The Obsessives
 The Pooches
 Provide
 Shannen Moser
 Slaughter Beach, Dog
 Steady Hands
 superviolet
 The Superweaks
 Thin Lips
 Three Man Cannon
 Trace Mountains
 U.S. Highball
 Walter Etc.
 Yankee Bluff
 Year of Glad
 Yours Are The Only Ears

Compilations

References

External links
 Official website
 Bandcamp

American independent record labels
Companies based in Philadelphia
Indie rock record labels
Record labels established in 2012
Rock record labels